Edge is a UK-based educational foundation.

In 2003, educational services provider Edexcel was partially sold to Pearson PLC. The trustees of Edexcel opted to use the proceeds of the sale to set up an educational foundation, and formed Edge in November 2004. The trustees of the foundation identified the promotion of practical and vocational learning as the new organisation's primary objective. Since its inception, Edge has invested millions of pounds in practical learning schemes and initiatives run by other organisations, as well as running its own projects.

References

2004 establishments in the United Kingdom
Education in the City of Westminster
Educational charities based in the United Kingdom
Educational foundations
Organisations based in the City of Westminster
Organizations established in 2004
Vocational education in the United Kingdom